The  was a series of firebombing air raids by the United States Army Air Force during the Pacific campaigns of World War II. Operation Meetinghouse, which was conducted on the night of 9–10 March 1945, is the single most destructive bombing raid in human history.  of central Tokyo were destroyed, leaving an estimated 100,000 civilians dead and over one million homeless. In comparison, the atomic bombing of Hiroshima in August 1945 resulted in the immediate death of between 70,000 and 150,000 people.

The US first mounted a seaborne, small-scale air raid on Tokyo (the "Doolittle Raid") in April 1942. Strategic bombing and urban area bombing began in 1944 after the long-range B-29 Superfortress bomber entered service, first deployed from China and thereafter the Mariana Islands. B-29 raids from those islands began on 17 November 1944, and lasted until 15 August 1945, the day of Japanese surrender.

Over 50% of Tokyo's industry was spread out among residential and commercial neighborhoods; firebombing cut the whole city's output in half. Some modern post-war analysts have called the raid a war crime due to the targeting of civilian infrastructure and the ensuing mass loss of civilian life.

Doolittle Raid

The raid was retaliation against the Japanese attack on Pearl Harbor. The raid did little damage to Japan's war capability but was a significant propaganda victory for the United States. Launched at longer range than planned when the task force encountered a Japanese picket boat, all of the attacking aircraft either crashed or ditched short of the airfields designated for landing. One aircraft landed in the neutral Soviet Union where the crew was interned, but then smuggled over the border into Iran on 11 May 1943. Two crews were captured by the Japanese in occupied China. Three crewmen from these groups were later executed.

B-29 raids

Almost 90% of the bombs dropped on the home islands of Japan were delivered by this type of bomber. Once Allied ground forces had captured islands sufficiently close to Japan, airfields were built on those islands (particularly Saipan and Tinian) and B-29s could reach Japan for bombing missions.

The initial raids were carried out by the Twentieth Air Force operating out of mainland China in Operation Matterhorn under XX Bomber Command, but these could not reach Tokyo. Operations from the Northern Mariana Islands commenced in November 1944 after the XXI Bomber Command was activated there. The high-altitude bombing attacks using general-purpose bombs were observed to be ineffective by USAAF leaders due to high winds—later discovered to be the jet stream—which carried the bombs off target. Between May and September 1943, bombing trials were conducted on the Japanese Village set-piece target, located at the Dugway Proving Grounds. These trials demonstrated the effectiveness of incendiary bombs against wood-and-paper buildings, and resulted in Curtis LeMay's ordering the bombers to change tactics to utilize these munitions against Japan.

The first such raid was against Kobe on 4 February 1945. Tokyo was hit by incendiaries on 25 February 1945 when 174 B-29s flew a high altitude raid during daylight hours and destroyed around  (2.6 km2) of the snow-covered city, using 453.7 tons of mostly incendiaries with some fragmentation bombs. LeMay ordered all defensive guns but the tail gun removed from the B-29s so that the aircraft would be lighter and use less fuel.

Operation Meetinghouse

On the night of 9–10 March 1945, 334 B-29s took off to raid with 279 of them dropping 1,665 tons of bombs on Tokyo. The M-69s punched through thin roofing material or landed on the ground; in either case they ignited 3–5 seconds later, throwing out a jet of flaming napalm globs. A lesser number of M-47 incendiaries were also dropped: the M-47 was a  jelled-gasoline and white phosphorus bomb which ignited upon impact. In the first two hours of the raid, 226 of the attacking aircraft unloaded their bombs to overwhelm the city's fire defenses. Approximately  of the city were destroyed and some 100,000 people are estimated to have died. A grand total of 282 of the 339 B-29s launched for "Meetinghouse" made it to the target, 27 of which were lost due to being shot down by Japanese air defenses, mechanical failure, or being caught in updrafts caused by the fires.

The Operation Meetinghouse firebombing of Tokyo on the night of 9 March 1945 was the single deadliest air raid of World War II, greater than Dresden, Hamburg, Hiroshima, or Nagasaki as single events.

Results

Damage to Tokyo's heavy industry was slight until firebombing destroyed much of the light industry that was used as an integral source for small machine parts and time-intensive processes. Firebombing also killed or made homeless many workers who had taken part in the war industry. Over 50% of Tokyo's industry was spread out among residential and commercial neighborhoods; firebombing cut the whole city's output in half. The destruction and damage were especially severe in the eastern areas of the city. The districts bombed were home to 1.2 million people. Tokyo police recorded 267,171 buildings destroyed, which left more than one million people homeless.

Emperor Hirohito's tour of the destroyed areas of Tokyo in March 1945 was the beginning of his personal involvement in the peace process, culminating in Japan's surrender six months later.

Casualty estimates

The US Strategic Bombing Survey later estimated that nearly 88,000 people died in this one raid, 41,000 were injured, and over a million residents lost their homes. The Tokyo Fire Department estimated a higher toll: 97,000 killed and 125,000 wounded. The Tokyo Metropolitan Police Department established a figure of 83,793 dead and 40,918 wounded and 286,358 buildings and homes destroyed. Historian Richard Rhodes put deaths at over 100,000, injuries at a million and homeless residents at a million. These casualty and damage figures could be low; Mark Selden wrote in Japan Focus:

In his 1968 book, reprinted in 1990, historian Gabriel Kolko cited a figure of 125,000 deaths. Elise K. Tipton, professor of Japan studies, arrived at a rough range of 75,000 to 200,000 deaths. Donald L. Miller, citing Knox Burger, stated that there were "at least 100,000" Japanese deaths and "about one million" injured.

The entire bombing campaign against Japan killed more than 300,000 people and injured an additional 400,000, mostly civilians.

Postwar recovery

After the war, Tokyo struggled to rebuild. In 1945 and 1946, the city received a share of the national reconstruction budget roughly proportional to its amount of bombing damage (26.6%), but in successive years Tokyo saw its share dwindle. By 1949, Tokyo was given only 10.9% of the budget; at the same time there was runaway inflation devaluing the money. Occupation authorities such as Joseph Dodge stepped in and drastically cut back on Japanese government rebuilding programs, focusing instead on simply improving roads and transportation. Tokyo did not experience fast economic growth until the 1950s.

Memorials

Between 1948 and 1951 the ashes of 105,400 people killed in the attacks on Tokyo were interred in Yokoamicho Park in Sumida Ward. A memorial to the raids was opened in the park in March 2001. The park has a list of names of people who died of the Bombing, which is made based on the applications from bereaved families and it has 81,273 names as of March 2020. Bereaved families can submit application to have the names of victims written in the list to the government of Tokyo.

After the war, Japanese author Katsumoto Saotome, a survivor of 10 March 1945 firebombing, helped start a library about the raid in Koto Ward called the Center of the Tokyo Raids and War Damage. The library contains documents and literature about the raid plus survivor accounts collected by Saotome and the Association to Record the Tokyo Air Raid.

Postwar Japanese politics
In 2007, 112 members of the Association for the Bereaved Families of the Victims of the Tokyo Air Raids brought a class action against the Japanese government, demanding an apology and 1.232 billion yen in compensation. Their suit charged that the Japanese government invited the raid by failing to end the war earlier, and then failed to help the civilian victims of the raids while providing considerable support to former military personnel and their families. The plaintiffs' case was dismissed at the first judgement in December 2009, and their appeal was rejected. The plaintiffs then appealed to the Supreme Court, which rejected their case in May 2013.

In 2013, during Japanese Prime Minister Shinzō Abe's second term, Abe's cabinet stated that the raids were "incompatible with humanitarianism, which is one of the foundations of international law", but also noted that it is difficult to argue that the raids were illegal under the international laws of the time.

Partial list of missions

B-29
 24 November 1944: 111 B-29s hit an aircraft factory on the rim of the city.
 27 November 1944: 81 B-29s hit the dock and urban area and 13 targets of opportunity.
 29–30 November 1944: two incendiary raids on industrial areas, burning 2,773 structures.
 19 February 1945: 119 B-29s hit port and urban area.
 24 February 1945: 229 B-29s plus over 1600 carrier-based planes.
 25 February 1945: 174 B-29s dropping incendiaries destroy 28,000 buildings.
 4 March 1945: 159 B-29s hit urban area.
 10 March 1945: 334 B-29s dropping incendiaries destroy 267,000 buildings; 25% of city (Operation Meetinghouse) killing some 100,000.
 2 April 1945: 100 B-29s bomb the Nakajima aircraft factory.
 3 April 1945: 68 B-29s bomb the Koizumi aircraft factory and urban areas in Tokyo.
 7 April 1945: 101 B-29s bomb the Nakajima aircraft factory again
 13 April 1945: 327 B-29s bomb the arsenal area.
 20 July 1945: 1 B-29 drops a Pumpkin bomb (bomb with same ballistics as the Fat Man nuclear bomb) through overcast. It was aimed at, but missed, the Imperial Palace.
 8 August 1945: 60 B-29s bomb the aircraft factory and arsenal.
 10 August 1945: 70 B-29s bomb the arsenal complex.

Other
16–17 February 1945: carrier-based aircraft, including dive bombers, escorted by Hellcat fighters attacked Tokyo. Over two days, over 1,500 American planes and hundreds of Japanese planes were in the air. "By the end of 17 February, more than five hundred Japanese planes, both on the ground and in the air, had been lost, and Japan's aircraft works had been badly hit. The Americans lost eighty planes."

18 August 1945: The last U.S. air combat casualty of World War II occurred during mission 230 A-8, when two Consolidated B-32 Dominators of the 386th Bomb Squadron, 312th Bomb Group, launched from Yontan Airfield, Okinawa, for a photo reconnaissance run over Tokyo, Japan. Both bombers were attacked by several Japanese fighters of both the 302nd Naval Air Group at Atsugi and the Yokosuka Air Group that made 10 gunnery passes. Japanese IJNAS aces Sadamu Komachi and Saburō Sakai were part of this attack. The B-32 piloted by 1st Lt. John R. Anderson, was hit at 20,000 feet; cannon fire knocked out the number two (port inner) engine, and three crew were injured, including Sgt. Anthony J. Marchione, 19, of the 20th Reconnaissance Squadron, who took a 20 mm hit to the chest and died 30 minutes later. Tail gunner Sgt. John Houston destroyed one attacker. The lead bomber, Consolidated B-32-20-CF Dominator, 42-108532, "Hobo Queen II", piloted by 1st Lt. James Klein, was not seriously damaged but the second Consolidated B-32-35-CF Dominator, 42-108578, lost an engine, had the upper turret knocked out of action, and partially lost rudder control. Both bombers landed at Yontan Airfield just past ~1800 hrs. having survived the last air combat of the Pacific war. The following day, propellers were removed from Japanese aircraft as part of the surrender agreement. Marchione was buried on Okinawa on 19 August, his body being returned to his Pottstown, Pennsylvania home on 18 March 1949. He was interred in St. Aloysius Old Cemetery with full military honors. "Hobo Queen II" was dismantled at Yonton Airfield following a 9 September nosegear collapse and damage during lifting. B-32, 42-108578, was scrapped at Kingman, Arizona after the war.

See also
 Strategic bombing during World War II
 Evacuations of civilians in Japan during World War II

References

Further reading

External links

 67 Japanese cities firebombed in World War II.
 Army Air Forces in World War II.
 The Center of the Tokyo Raid and War Damages / Introduction.
  Transcript of a radio documentary/commentary on the Tokyo firebombing with excerpts from interviews with participants and witnesses.
 
 

World War II aerial operations and battles of the Pacific theatre
Aerial operations and battles of World War II by town or city
Japan in World War II
World War II strategic bombing of Japan
1940s conflicts
History of Tokyo
Japan campaign
Firebombings in Japan
1940s in Tokyo
Japan–United States military relations